Nagina is a 1986 Indian fantasy romance film, produced and directed by  Harmesh Malhotra, with a screenplay written by Ravi Kapoor and story by Jagmohan Kapoor. The film stars Sridevi as Rajni, a Nāginī who marries a civilian to avenge the death of her spouse at the hands of an evil saint. It also stars Rishi Kapoor, Komal Mahuvakar, Amrish Puri, Sushma Seth and Prem Chopra. Then dubbed in Telugu as Naagini.

Nagina was theatrically released on 28 November 1986. Upon its release, it was a widespread success grossing over ₹13 crore at the box office, becoming the  second-highest-grossing Indian film of 1986. The success of the film proved to be one of the biggest blockbusters of the year. And major watershed moment in  Indian cinema, as the film, despite being a woman-centric movie became a massive commercial success. A sequel to the film was released; Nigahen: Nagina Part II (1989), but failed commercially. Today, Nagina is considered one of Sridevi's finest performances.

Plot
Rajiv comes from a wealthy land-owning family. He returns to India from London after studies and lives in a palatial home with his mother, who would like him to marry a beautiful young woman named Vijaya Singh, the only daughter of Thakur Ajay Singh. Rajiv, however, is in love with Rajni, who is an orphan without connections. When Rajiv informs his mother of his intent to marry Rajni, she refuses to give her blessings, but relents after a favourable meeting with Rajni. The marriage is arranged and they enjoy their marriage – until the arrival of Bhairo Nath, a sadhu capable of controlling snakes. He informs Rajiv's mother that Rajni is an Ichchadhari Naagin, a female shape-shifting venomous Cobra who has married Rajiv to avenge the death of her spouse during Rajiv's childhood.

To remove her from the household, Bhairo and his disciples perform a pooja, forcing Rajni to change herself to her snake form by the tunes of a snake charmer flute. However, when Rajiv comes into the house, Rajni escapes, only to be caught by Bhairo, who reveals his plot—to control the world with the Mani, a sacred jewel that only Rajni knows is hidden. Rajiv engages in a fight with Bhairo, who is bitten by two snakes and dies. Rajiv and Rajni live happily ever after.

Cast

Soundtrack
The film's music was provided by Laxmikant–Pyarelal. Lyrics were written by Anand Bakshi. Sound track contained total five songs, one of which was duet and rest were all solo number.

Hindi version

Telugu version
Lyrics were written by Rajasri and Gona Vijayaratnam.

Release

Reception
According to Taran Adarsh, Nagina turned out to be the biggest blockbuster of the year, with Box Office India stating that Sridevi remained "the undisputed No.1". The movie was appreciated for its screenplay, dialogues and direction. Named one of the best snake fantasy films by Yahoo, Times of India ranked Nagina as one of the 'Top 10 Snake Films of Hindi Cinema'. Sridevi's climax dance number "Main Teri Dushman" also remains one of the best snake dances in Bollywood with Desi Hits calling it "one of Sridevi's most iconic dance numbers... that still gives fans goose bumps" and iDiva describing it as "the stuff of movie legends".

In 2013, Sridevi was given the Filmfare Special Award for her performances in Nagina as well as Mr. India (1987) to recognise her work at that time.

Box Office 
The film was a commercial success, grossing approximately ₹4.75 cr.

Sequel 
This movie was followed by a sequel in 1989 called Nigahen: Nagina Part II.

Technical Specifications

Legacy 
According to the Bengali author Suman Sen, Nagina was the main inspiration to write his novel Sarpa Manav: Nagmoni Rohosyo. The author also had mentioned the film's name in a small part.

References

External links 
 

1986 films
1980s Hindi-language films
Films scored by Laxmikant–Pyarelal
Films about snakes
1980s romantic fantasy films
Indian romantic fantasy films
Films directed by Harmesh Malhotra
Films about shapeshifting